Bottom's Dream ( or ZETTEL’S TRAUM as the author wrote the title) is a novel published in 1970 by West German author Arno Schmidt. Schmidt began writing the novel in December 1963 while he and Hans Wollschläger began to translate the works of Edgar Allan Poe into German. The novel was inspired by James Joyce's novel Finnegans Wake, particularly Schmidt's use of columns (his "SpaltenTechnik"), which Schmidt claimed was borrowed from the Wake.

The story itself is based on the questions of translating Edgar Allan Poe, following a couple who visits the home of a Poe translator to discuss his work. It is written in an idiosyncratic style, one in which Schmidt attempts to apply a Freudian understanding of language to the text by using various typographic features which alter the usual flow of text. 

The gargantuan novel was published in folio format with 1,334 pages. The story is told mostly in three shifting columns, presenting the text in the form of notes, collages, and typewritten pages.

Title
The title is an adaption from a character and a scene in Shakespeare's 
A Midsummer Night's Dream.
At the end of Act IV, Scene 1, the awaking weaver Bottom says:
"I have had a dream, past the wit of man to
say what dream it was: man is but an ass, if he go
about to expound this dream. Methought I was—there
is no man can tell what. Methought I was,—and 
methought I had,—but man is but a patched fool, if
he will offer to say what methought I had. The eye
of man hath not heard, the ear of man hath not
seen, man's hand is not able to taste, his tongue
to conceive, nor his heart to report, what my dream 
was. I will get Peter Quince to write a ballad of
this dream: it shall be called Bottom's Dream,
because it hath no bottom;..."

Christoph Martin Wieland translated the play in 1762 into German prose. 
His weaver Bottom (bottom = ball of yarn) bears accordingly a German term of weaving as his name, Zettel, which was apt for a translation of the last line (to "weil darin alles verzettelt ist", roughly 'because in it all is mixed up'). Hence "Zettels Traum" is German for Bottom's Dream.

Summary
The novel begins around 4 AM on Midsummer's Day 1968 in the Lüneburg Heath in northeastern Lower Saxony in northern Germany, and concludes twenty-five hours later. It follows the lives of 54-year-old Daniel Pagenstecher, visiting translators Paul Jacobi and his wife Wilma, and their 16-year-old daughter Franziska. The story is concerned with the problems of translating Edgar Allan Poe into German and with exploring the themes he conveys, especially regarding sexuality.

The novel is divided into eight books, as follows:

References

Editions

Other sources

Citations

External links
 Esther Yi: Page-Turner: A Great Translator Takes on One Final and Nearly Impossible Project, The New Yorker, 3. November 2016

1970 German novels
Novels by Arno Schmidt
Works about Edgar Allan Poe